Mardepodect (developmental code name PF-2545920) is a drug which was developed by Pfizer for the treatment of schizophrenia. It acts as a phosphodiesterase inhibitor selective for the PDE10A subtype. The PDE10A enzyme is expressed primarily in the brain, mostly in the striatum, nucleus accumbens and olfactory tubercle, and is thought to be particularly important in regulating the activity of dopamine-sensitive medium spiny neurons in the striatum which are known to be targets of conventional antipsychotic drugs. Older PDE10A inhibitors such as papaverine have been shown to produce antipsychotic effects in animal models, and more potent and selective PDE10A inhibitors are a current area of research for novel antipsychotic drugs which act through a different pathway to conventional dopamine or 5-HT2A antagonist drugs and may have a more favourable side effects profile. Mardepodect is currently one of the furthest advanced PDE10A inhibitors in development and has progressed through to Phase II clinical trials in humans. In 2017, development of mardepodect for the treatment of schizophrenia and Huntington's disease was discontinued.

References 
 

Abandoned drugs
Pfizer brands
Phenol ethers
Phosphodiesterase inhibitors
Pyrazoles
4-Pyridyl compounds
Quinolines